Sallows is a surname. Notable people with the surname include:

Cary-Anne McTaggart (born Cary-Anne Sallows) (b. 1986),  Canadian curler
Lee Sallows (b. 1944), British electronics engineer
Reuben R. Sallows (1855–1937), Canadian photographer
Thomas Sallows (b. 1984), Canadian curler